Jake Martin is a fictional character on the long-running American daytime drama, All My Children. Since the character's on-screen birth in 1979, he has been portrayed by several actors: Michael Scalera, Michael Brainard, Michael Lowry, J. Eddie Peck and Ricky Paull Goldin, who took over the role on April 30, 2008, until the series finale on September 23, 2011.

Storylines
Jake, originally known as Joey, is the late-in-life son born to Joe Martin and his second wife, Ruth, who is a nurse. He  fell in love with Emily Ann Sago, the daughter of reformed prostitute Estelle LaTour. Although the two marry against Joe's and Ruth's wishes, their love wasn't meant to last. Emily Ann becomes pregnant shortly after they married but later miscarries the child. When Emily Ann discovers that sadistic pimp Billy Clyde Tuggle was actually her birth father, she becomes mentally unhinged. After trying to help her the best he could, Joey divorces her after she is institutionalized. Soon after, Joey leaves for medical school in 1991.

Joey returns to Pine Valley in 1996, now known as Jake. Having dropped out of medical school, he becomes a handyman. He marries Gillian Andrassy in 2000, but the two divorce the next year, and Gillian miscarries their baby in February 2001. For a time, Jake is believed to be the father of Liza Colby's daughter, Colby Chandler, though this is proven untrue. Jake becomes involved with Greenlee Smythe and falls in love with her. Greenlee falls in love with Jake too, but at the same time still loves Leo. After his relationship with Greenlee ends he becomes involved with Mia Saunders, but he eventually became engaged and marries fellow doctor Cara Castillo. He restarts up his medical career before leaving Pine Valley in 2003. In August 2007, he calls his nephew, Jamie Martin, for help in Africa with AIDS patients.

Months later, Jake Martin was being held hostage in Darfur and Zach Slater sent Aidan Devane to bring Jake back. Once out of harm's way, they returned safely to Pine Valley. Although Jake expressed plans to return to Sudan, big brother Tad convinced him to stay. Jake began working at the hospital with Joe, and reconnected with Angie Hubbard. He also renewed a bond with Dr. Frankie Hubbard, who considers him his mentor and who Jake considers the little brother he never had. Jake performed a miracle by saving Ian Slater's life after both Zach and Kendall thought he was dead.

Jake started a relationship with Amanda Dillon, even though they both kept it mostly physical. When Jake met Taylor Thompson, an Iraq war veteran, his relationship with Amanda became more distant, and as a result, Amanda broke up with him. Later, Jake broke up with Taylor when her fiancé, Brot Monroe, was discovered to be alive. Meanwhile, Jake found out that Amanda was pregnant with either JR Chandler or David Hayward's baby. Jake gives her the prenatal care needed, as well as a place to stay when she is kicked out of her own place. When Amanda figures out that David is the father of the baby from a sonogram, Jake helps keep David away in order to protect Amanda's baby from David's influence. In doing so, Jake truly falls in love with Amanda, and they got married on June 11, 2009 by Tad. On their honeymoon, Amanda gives birth to a baby boy.

Jake and Amanda fake the baby's death so that David will not try to find it, while Jake gives the baby to Liza Colby, who he made a side deal with. Later, it is revealed Jake gave Liza another baby put up for adoption, and hid Amanda's baby in the countryside because he knew she could not live without her son. Amanda was reunited with her son, whom she named Trevor after her father. Amanda had a plan to find her son abandoned and then "adopt" him. The plan went awry, however, when Trevor was kidnapped, and David found him before Jake and Amanda could. He told Amanda that she and Jake would be arrested unless she agreed to move into his place with Trevor. Amanda agreed, and Jake was upset about this. Jake nearly left her and Pine Valley as a result, but later changed his mind and stayed. Trevor and Amanda moved back in with Jake in December 2009, when David claimed he was dying of a rare blood disease and let Amanda go as a goodwill gesture. In January, Amanda found out that the blood disease David had was hereditary, and had Trevor tested. When the results came back negative, she and Jake were suspicious, and had a paternity test done, which confirmed what Jake and Amanda had hoped: Jake was Trevor's biological father; they kicked David out of their lives for good.

When Amanda went back to work at Fusion as a model, she gained a stalker named "Amandafan" whose behavior became increasingly obsessive. Jake, initially supportive of her career, became worried about Amanda's safety and told her to stay home with Officer Natalia Fowler guarding her. It turned out "Amandafan" was Amanda's insane mother, Janet Dillon, and Jake saved Natalia and Amanda from Janet when she broke into the apartment while they were at home. Amanda began questioning her ability as a mother after Janet convinced her she is just like her mother, even though Jake constantly reassured her. Realizing he and Amanda never had a proper wedding ceremony, he gave Amanda the chance to have the wedding of her dreams in a vow renewal ceremony. Amanda accepted, and was able to gain back her happiness and confidence.

In November 2010, Dr. Griffin Castillo showed up in Pine Valley and was revealed to be the man who ran away with Jake's ex-wife, Cara. Jake started to remember his ex-wife often and kept from Amanda the fact that Griffin broke his and Cara's marriage. In December, Cara showed up in Pine Valley, claiming to want Jake to return to Doctors without Borders. Later, she was forced to stay in the country when her paperwork was not filed correctly. Jake eventually found out that Griffin was Cara's brother, and Cara said she left because she felt like she married too young and was stuck in a relationship. Jake later found out Cara still wore their wedding ring, and she revealed that some men in Africa threatened his life, and she left to protect him and she still loves him. She realizes he's moved on, but she came back because she missed him and needed to see him. Cara later discovered she was still a target and could be killed if she returned to Africa. In February 2011, Cara was detained by Immigration officials who found out she was traveling on a fraudulent passport. In order to save her, Tad claimed they were engaged, which put Jake in an awkward position, though he accepted the marriage. When he found out Amanda was the one who called Immigration on Cara, he became upset and even more distant from her. Cara and Tad married on March 8, 2011, and Jake, with some help from his father, later helped Cara get hired full-time at the hospital. Meanwhile, Amanda got hired by JR as a PR consultant for Chandler Enterprises, which Jake was not happy about. Amanda and Jake became the godparents of Lucy Hubbard, Angie and Jesse's daughter.

Amanda suggests to Jake that they have another baby, but Jake is not too sure about this. While Cara is working at the free clinic, Jake comes by often and they reminisce about their time in DWB. They end up kissing, but they pull away before going any further. Jake starts to pull away from Amanda, guilt-ridden about what happened with Cara. One evening, Jake ends up in isolation at the hospital with Cara, and decides to tell Amanda the truth when he can't get hold of her. Jake goes home that night, and tells her, and Amanda slaps him in anger. Jake later tries to make it up to Amanda by setting up a picnic and a romantic dinner at their apartment. Later, when Amanda starts to get cramps, Jake thinks she might be pregnant, and decides it would be a good time to expand their family. However, Amanda's test comes back negative.

Amanda later admits to Jake that she has an STD. Jake thinks it might have come before they were married, but Amanda confesses that the night Jake told her about him and Cara, she had slept with JR. When Jake realizes that he drove her to have a one-night stand, he decides to forgive her, but Amanda's not sure about that and leaves. He later admits to Tad he thinks his marriage is falling apart. Tad tells him to make a decision about whether or not he wants to stay married to Amanda. Jake chooses to stay with his wife. Jake finds out Amanda has HPV, which means she could possibly have cancer. While they are running tests, Amanda apologizes to Cara, who forgives her and also gives her some advice about how to deal with a cancer diagnosis. While waiting for the results, Amanda tells Jake that she wants him to move on in case something happens to her. Jake, though, refuses to let her give up and tells her they will fight against the cancer, if she has it. Jake is there when Amanda finds out that she has cancer. Jake starts staying overnight at the hospital, trying to find a solution to help Amanda. Jake and Amanda find out that her cancer is not that advanced, but the doctor does recommend Amanda has a hysterectomy, which means she won't be able to have any more children. Amanda decides to go through with it, and Jake realizes just how much Amanda and Trevor mean to him. Cara later tells him to not keep Amanda out, as she is hurting just as much as he is. Jake later talks to Amanda and promises that no matter what happens, he's always going to stay by her side from now on.

Before Amanda goes in for the surgery, Janet is admitted to the hospital after Oak Haven is burned down. Amanda tells her mother about her cancer diagnosis, and how much Jake has been helping her since then. Janet, surprisingly, gives Amanda some advice that makes her feel better. Afterwards, she tells Jake that she did need her mother in that moment, and he's glad she's feeling better about what happens next. Amanda goes in for surgery, and Jake prays he won't lose her because he needs her now. When she comes out of surgery, she is unconscious for an unusually long amount of time, which worries Jake. When she eventually wakes up, Jake promises to never leave her side. Jake is happy when he and Amanda find out the cancer is completely gone and the surgery was successful. While Amanda is unhappy about not having another child, Jake tells her they can look at adopting a child, which restores hope to Amanda. Jake and Amanda are shocked when they find out Dixie Cooney, Tad's true love who was presumed dead, is actually alive. At the end of the series, Jake and Amanda are looking into adoption and celebrating Tad and Dixie's engagement.

External links 
 Jake Martin profile

All My Children characters
Television characters introduced in 1979
Fictional physicians
Male characters in television